Katipunan is a 2013 historical Philippine television drama series broadcast by GMA Network. The series is based on the history of the Philippine society Katipunan. Directed by King Mark Baco, it stars Sid Lucero. It premiered on October 19, 2013. The series concluded on December 28, 2013 with a total of 10 episodes.

The series is streaming online on YouTube.

Cast and characters

Lead cast
 Sid Lucero as Andres Bonifacio

Supporting cast
 Glaiza de Castro as Gregoria de Jesus
 Roi Vinzon as Villalon
 Benjamin Alves as Sebastian
 Dominic Roco as Pacquing
 Nico Antonio as Emilio Aguinaldo

Guest cast
 Jill Palencia as Juanita
 Mercedes Cabral as Teresa Magbanua
 Nasser as Jose Rizal
 Christian Villete as Crispulo Aguinaldo
 Gexter Abad as Baldomero Aguinaldo
 RJ Agustin as Emilio Jacinto
 Jerald Napoles as Macario Sakay
 Earle Figuracion as Daniel Tirona
 Raffy Atar as Troadio Bonifacio
 Alchris Galura as Procopio Bonifacio
 John Prinz Strachan as Deodato Arellano
 Bernard Carritero as Deogratias Fojas
 VJ Mendoza as Aurelio Tolentino
 Jack Love Pacis as Mariano Álvarez
 Allen Edzfar as Santiago Alvarez
 Giovanni Baldesseri as Figueroa
 Justin Candado II as Artemio Ricarte
 Raul Morit as Nicolas de Jesus
 Yuwin Cruz as Pío Valenzuela
 John Relucio as Sancho Valenzuela
 Lourdes Serrano as Trinidad Fojas 
 Celeste dela Cruz as Trinidad Rizal
 Vic Romano as Tata Pinong
 Angelita Loresco as Tandang Sora
 Edgar Ebro as Raymundo Mata
 Gio Emprese as Tagausig
 Juan Rodrigo as older Sebastian

Episodes
A primer episode, Anak ng Bayan: The Katipunan Primer aired on October 12, 2013.

Ratings
According to AGB Nielsen Philippines' Mega Manila household television ratings, the pilot episode of Katipunan earned a 13.7% rating. While the final episode scored a 13.4% rating.

Accolades

References

External links
 
 

2013 Philippine television series debuts
2013 Philippine television series endings
Cultural depictions of Andrés Bonifacio
Filipino-language television shows
GMA Network drama series
GMA Integrated News and Public Affairs shows
Television series set in the 19th century
Television shows set in the Philippines